Joseph Matar (born Joseph Toufic Matar in 1935) is a Lebanese painter and poet. He was first educated in Jounieh and by the 1950s he studied painting under Omar Onsi among others. In 1963 he furthered his education at the University of Paris and he has studied in other parts of Europe as well. As a painter he has had over sixty one-man shows. As a poet he is a winner of the Said Akl award.

References

External links 
Lebanon Art site on Joseph Matar

Lebanese painters
Lebanese male poets
University of Paris alumni
1935 births
Living people